The Theater Lübeck (formerly Stage of the Hansestadt Lübeck, colloquially Stadttheater) is one of the largest theaters in the German state of Schleswig-Holstein.  It is managed by Theater Lübeck GmbH, a state-owned company of the Hansestadt Lübeck.

Public interest in theatrical works and opera arose in Lübeck in the early days of the Age of Enlightenment and the first opera production in the city took place on 2 June 1746 in the house of master craftsman Schröder Ecke on the Königstraße.  The predecessor of the current building dates from 1752.  The transition of the company to the city in the 19th century is described by Thomas Mann in his novel Buddenbrooks.

Prominent conductors that began their careers in Lübeck include Hermann Abendroth, Wilhelm Furtwängler and Christoph von Dohnányi.

Structure
The Theater was built in 1908 in the Art Nouveau style, on the site of an 18th-century theater on the Beckergrube in Lübeck's Old City.  It was designed by Martin Dülfer and construction was funded by local businessman and philanthropist Emil Possehl. The reliefs on the sandstone facade are the work of sculptor Georg Roemer. The relief in the center depicts Apollo and the Nine Muses, with Comedy and Tragedy represented on either side. The gable end supports depicting Caryatids and Atlas are the work of Hamburg plasterer Karl Weinberger. The facade and the entire building received a complete restoration in the 1990s.

The theater today
The theater offerings include a variety of cultural activities, including opera, ballet, chamber music, and plays, as well as concerts of the Lübeck Philharmonic Orchestra.

The theater management has included Karl Vibach (1968–1978), Hans Thoenies (1978–1991), Dietrich von Oertzen (1991–2000) and Marc Adam (2000–2007). Since 2007 the theater has been managed by committee.

50% of the proceeds of Theater Lübeck GmbH go to the city of Lübeck. 12.5% each go to the regional governments of the surrounding districts of Herzogtum Lauenburg and Nordwestmecklenburg, the Chamber of Commerce ("Kaufmannschaft"), and the Gesellschaft der Theaterfreunde e. V. Lübeck (Friends of the Theater).

References
Notes

Sources
Heinrich Asmus: Die dramatische Kunst und das Theater zu Lübeck (Dramatic arts and the theater at Lübeck). Von Rohden, Lübeck 1862
Klaus Matthias: Grossbauten der Lübecker Innenstadt nach 1900. Von der Überwindung des Historismus zum Jugendstil. In: Der Wagen 1992, S. 182–205 (see p. 193ff for details on architecture and the facade)
Carl Stiehl: Geschichte des Theaters in Lübeck (History of the Lübeck Theater). Borchers, Lübeck 1902

External links

 Official web site

Theater Lubeck
Theater Lubeck
Theatres in Germany
Opera houses in Germany
Theater Lubeck
Theater Lubeck
Theatres completed in 1908
Music venues completed in 1908
Art Nouveau theatres
1908 establishments in Germany